NGMS may refer to:
National Guard Military School
National Gypsy Minority Self-Government
Next Generation Mobile Services
Noel Grisham Middle School